Henry Moses Pollard (June 14, 1836 – February 24, 1904) was a U.S. Representative from Missouri.

Born in Plymouth, Vermont, Pollard attended the common schools. He graduated from Dartmouth College in Hanover, New Hampshire, in 1857. He moved to Milwaukee, Wisconsin, where he studied law. He was admitted to the bar in 1861. He returned to Vermont and served during the Civil War in the Union Army as major in the Eighth Regiment, Vermont Volunteers. He moved to Chillicothe, Missouri, in 1865 and commenced the practice of law. He served as mayor in 1874. County attorney in 1876.

Pollard was elected as a Republican to the Forty-fifth Congress (March 4, 1877 – March 3, 1879). He was an unsuccessful candidate for reelection to the Forty-sixth Congress. He moved to St. Louis, Missouri, in 1879 and continued the practice of law in that city until his death on February 24, 1904. He was interred in Edgewood Cemetery, Chillicothe, Missouri.

References

1836 births
1904 deaths
Dartmouth College alumni
Union Army officers
Republican Party members of the United States House of Representatives from Missouri
19th-century American politicians
People from Chillicothe, Missouri
People from Plymouth, Vermont
Mayors of places in Missouri